The Metropolitan Museum of Art possesses in its collection a gilt-silver tureen from the Napoleonic era. Designed by Charles Percier, Pierre François Léonard Fontaine and made by Martin-Guillaume Biennais, the tureen was given to Napoleon I by his sister Pauline and her husband, Prince Camillo Borghese. The tureen was later donated to the Met as part of the bequest of Joseph Pulitzer.

References 

Metalwork of the Metropolitan Museum of Art